Brother Armin Altamirano Luistro, FSC (born December 24, 1961) is a Filipino Lasallian Brother who served as secretary of the Department of Education of the Philippines under President Benigno Aquino III. Luistro entered De La Salle Scholasticate (the center for academic training of De La Salle Brothers) in Manila on April 1979 while he was studying in De La Salle University (DLSU). He received the religious habit of the congregation on October 1981 at the La Salle Novitiate in Lipa. He professed his first religious vows on October 1982, and his final vows on May 1988.

He started teaching as a religion teacher at De La Salle Lipa in 1983. He was made provincial of the De La Salle Brothers Philippine District on April 1997, a post he held until 2003. On August 26, 2000, Luistro co-founded the De La Salle Catholic University Manado, in Indonesia with Josef Suwatan, Roman Catholic Bishop of Manado.

On April 2004, he succeeded Andrew Gonzalez as the president of De La Salle University System, consequently making him the president of eight De La Salle institutions. He worked into establishing De La Salle Philippines (DLSP) which replaced the system. The DLSP National Mission Council appointed him DLSP President and Chief Executive Officer on November 29, 2005.

He was appointed as the Secretary of Education of the Philippines on June 30, 2010, becoming the second De La Salle brother to hold the post—the other was Gonzalez who was in office from 1998 to 2001. Luistro has the least net worth among Aquino's cabinet. He had ₱89,000 (US$2,060). In contrast, the richest—Cesar Purisima who is Secretary of Finance—had ₱252 million (US$5.84 million).

The Alliance of Concerned Teachers (ACT) have expressed skepticism over Luistro's stand on sex education citing his religious background. Nevertheless, the Department of Education has included sex education in its curriculum for grade 5 to fourth year high school. Roman Catholic groups have criticized it for allegedly not covering the emotional, psychological and spiritual dimensions of sexuality.

Luistro is a major proponent of the K+12 Basic Education Program in the Philippines. The program sought to add two years to the previous 10-year basic education curriculum. Numerous parties had opposed the plan including Ateneo de Manila University President Bienvenido Nebres and progressive groups of students, teachers and parents.

Educational background 
Luistro was born on December 24, 1961, to José Dimayuga Luistro and Magdalena Aranda Altamirano-Luistro in Lipa, Batangas, Philippines. He attended first grade at Our Lady of the Rosary Academy in Lipa, grades 2 to 5 at Canossa Academy Lipa, and graduated elementary and high school at De La Salle Lipa. He pursued his undergraduate studies at De La Salle University in Manila under a scholarship, and was conferred Bachelor of Arts in Philosophy and Letters on March 1981. When asked in a Manila Bulletin interview in 2009, he shared that he had spent most of his education in Batangas, and since DLSU had no uniforms, he "wore all the badúy [unfashionable] type of shirts", as he put it, using the Tagalog word for "unfashionable", while most of his classmates were from elite high schools. Thus he says "I supposed [they] laughed at me."

In 1981 he entered into a program in Ateneo de Manila University, and was awarded a Certificate in Formation Institute for Religious Educators in 1985. He enrolled in a graduate program in DLSU in 1991, and was conferred a Master of Arts degree in Religious Education in 1993. He also graduated with a master's degree in religious education and values formation at the same university in 2003. He was conferred a doctorate degree in educational management on May 2005 from the University of St. La Salle in Bacolod.

He was made Doctor of Humane Letters, honoris causa, by La Salle University in Philadelphia, Pennsylvania, United States on May 9, 2004.

Religious and academic career 

Luistro entered the De La Salle Scholasticate (the center for academic training of De La Salle Brothers) in Manila on April 1979, and received the religious habit on October 1981 at the La Salle Novitiate in Lipa. He professed his first religious vows on October 1982, and his final vows on May 1988. In the Manila Bulletin interview, he said that teaching was the reason why he entered the congregation.

He started teaching as a religion teacher at De La Salle Lipa in 1983. He moved to La Salle Greenhills in 1986. He was made provincial of the De La Salle Brothers Philippine District on April 1997, a post he held until 2003.

On August 26, 2000, Luistro co-founded the De La Salle Catholic University of Manado, currently known as De La Salle University, in Indonesia with Josef Suwatan, Roman Catholic Bishop of Manado. DLSU in Manila supervised initial operations before it was transferred to the Philippine District.

On April 2004, he succeeded Andrew Gonzalez as the president of De La Salle University System, consequently making him the president of eight De La Salle institutions. In his inaugural speech, he acknowledged the "multiversity" concept of Gonzalez who established the system. In which structure, DLSU served as the flagship while other De La Salle institutions specialized in fields like agriculture, alternative education and medicine.

He did, however, find the system's structure unfeasible. He worked into establishing De La Salle Philippines which replaced the system. Under the reorganization, other De La Salle institutions were included in the network—a total of 17. Each De La Salle institution was autonomous and had its own president. The DLSP National Mission Council appointed him DLSP President and Chief Executive Officer on November 29, 2005.

Political involvement 

Luistro called for the resignation of President Gloria Macapagal Arroyo during the height of the Hello Garci scandal in 2005. In which time, he became close to the Aquino family, a prominent political family in the Philippines. He also delivered a eulogy (named Cory, the Heart of a Saint) during the wake of former President Corazon Aquino, and said "our closeness with her was really borne out of that period [Hello Garci scandal], none of her children went to La Salle."

Work at the Department of Education

President Benigno Aquino III, Corazon's son, appointed him as the secretary of the Department of Education. He was inaugurated on June 30, 2010,  becoming the second De La Salle brother to hold the post—the other was Gonzalez who was in office from 1998 to 2001.

Aquino gave Luistro two years to address problems, including insufficient books, classrooms and teachers. Luistro estimates a lack of 130,000 teachers, 72,000 classrooms, 7 million desks, 141,000 comfort rooms and 96 million books.

As of December 2010, Luistro has the least net worth among Aquino's cabinet. He had ₱89,000 (US$2,060). In contrast, the richest—Cesar Purisima who is Secretary of Finance—had ₱252 million (US$5.84 million). He declared an annual gross salary of ₱989,496 (US$22,900).

Sex education

The Alliance of Concerned Teachers (ACT) have expressed skepticism over Luistro's stand on sex education citing his religious background. Meanwhile, Luistro's predecessor, Mona Valisno expressed her confidence with Luistro.

The Department of Education has included sex education in its curriculum for grade 5 to fourth year high school. Roman Catholic groups have criticized it for allegedly not covering the emotional, psychological and spiritual dimensions of sexuality. Likewise, former Roman Catholic Archbishop of Lingayen-Dagupan Oscar V. Cruz criticized Luistro for his alleged lack of comment regarding the Reproductive Health Bill, which proposes to integrate sex education in public schools. He appealed Luistro to "stop teaching lewd studies [sex education] in schools" (trans.).

Luistro stated that sex education was not his priority. He instead wanted to focus on streamlining the bureaucracy of DepEd, which employs 600,000 employees (501,158 of which are teachers). In line with this, he announced on December 28, 2010, that DepEd would terminate all of its 67 consultants by the end of the year. The DepEd-National Employees Union, in response, has called for his resignation. Luistro argued, however, that "streamlining is a must" as bulk of the department's budget goes to funding the salary of its employees.

K+12 Basic Education Program

Luistro is a major proponent of the K+12 Basic Education Program in the Philippines. The program seeks to add two years to the current 10-year basic education curriculum, and make graduates more competitive. The program involves kindergarten, six years of elementary, four years of junior high school, and two years of senior high school. Kindergarten was required in 2012 while senior high school is planned to be included in the curriculum by 2016. DepEd said that 77 percent of its participants in fora are in favor of the change. Before its implementation in 2012, the Philippines was the only country in Asia which employed 10 years of basic education—all other countries had 12. Numerous parties have opposed the plan including Ateneo de Manila University President Bienvenido Nebres and progressive groups of students, teachers and parents. A spokesperson of No To K–12 Alliance said:

Indigenous framework of education 
Luistro signed on behalf of the Deped the national policy framework for Indigenous peoples education in 2011. The framework aims to address Indigenous peoples' lack of access to "culture-responsive basic education". The framework directs DepEd offices and units to ensure that textbooks and other learning materials are free from discriminatory and erroneous content that misrepresent the history and culture of Indigenous peoples.

References

External links 
 De La Salle University
 De La Salle Alumni Association
 Philippine Lasallian Family
 De La Salle Philippines
 Institute of the Brothers of the Christian Schools

|-

|-

|-

|-

|-

1961 births
Living people
Ateneo de Manila University alumni
De La Salle Brothers in the Philippines
De La Salle University alumni
Filipino Roman Catholics
Secretaries of Education of the Philippines
People from Lipa, Batangas
Roman Catholic religious brothers
Benigno Aquino III administration cabinet members
Presidents of universities and colleges in the Philippines
Visayan people